La Maison Tellier is a collection of short stories by Guy de Maupassant including the famous same titled story "La Maison Tellier" which was the first chapter in the collection. The book, further established Maupassant firmly as a prominent French writer following his huge success with the debut book Boule de suif. Five of the eight short stories included had already been published in various magazines like Revue politique et littéraire and  La Vie Moderne, but three of them were unpublished originals. 

Dedication
The introduction contained a famous dedication that said: "À Ivan Tourgueniev, hommage d'une affection et d'une grande admiration" (meaning to Ivan Turgenev, a homage of affection and a great admiration". The two writers had met in 1876 through a mutual friend Gustave Flaubert.

Critics
Émile Zola wrote a review calling it a "chef-d’œuvre" (a masterpiece). Zola's review was published in Le Figaro. But another critic, Léon Chapron, disagreed calling it "ordure" (i.e. junk) in a review in L'Événement.

Publications
The collection was first published in 1881 by editor Victor Havard. The collection was well received by many critics and by the public. It enjoyed a number of reprints within the ten years agreed with the publishing company.  

The collection was also re-published in an augmented edition a decade later in 1891 with publisher Paul Ollendorff. It included the same set of stories and an additional short story titled Les Tombales.

Stories included
(date of publication in parenthesis)
1881 edition 
 "La Maison Tellier" (unpublished)
 "Sur l'eau" (1876) - originally En Canot, not the same as the 1886 novella Sur l'eau. 
 "Histoire d'une fille de ferme" (1881) 
 "En famille" (1881) 
 "Le Papa de Simon" (1879) 
 "Une partie de champagne" (1881) 
 "Au printemps"  (unpublished)
 "La Femme de Paul"  (unpublished)
1891 edition
The 1891 edition included nine stories, eight from the original book and a new short story published in 1891 in the periodical Gil Blas and placed as the second story in the collection immediately after "La Maison Tellier", "Les Tombales" (1891).

External links
 

1881 short story collections
Short story collections by Guy de Maupassant